Hi-Q was a Romanian pop group, founded in 1996<ref name="libertatea-1">Îți plăcea look-ul Hi-Q înainte de despărțire, sau acum, după reunire?, libertatea.ro. Undated, apparently 2 June 2011. Retrieved 8 June 2012.</ref> in Braşov. The original group consisted of Mihai Sturzu, Florin Grozea, and Dana Nălbaru. Described by Libertatea as one of the best-known musical groups in Romania, Hi-Q also hosts its own TV show on national television. Dana Nălbaru left the group in 2003 to pursue a solo career and returned in October 2010.Dana Nălbaru a plâns la revenirea în trupa Hi-Q, libertatea.ro, 27 October 2010. Retrieved 8 June 2012. On 31 July 2014, on a news magazine show presented by Teo Trandafir, the band split.

Band members

Members
Florin-Alexandru Grozea: singer, songwriter, music producer (1996-2014)
Mihai Sturzu: singer, manager (1996-2014)
Dana Nălbaru: singer (1996–2003, late 2010–2014)

Former members
Nicoleta Drăgan: singer, songwriter, lyrics writer, joined after Nălbaru's 2003 departure, officially left the band in April 2008
Anya Buxai: singer, joined after Drăgan's 2008 departure, left the band in 2010

Band
Tuliga Florin - sound engineer
Cristi Matesan - drums
Virgil Dulceanu - keyboards
Mac Aciobăniței - guitar

Albums
 ...urasQbesc (1999)
 Dă muzica mai tare!!! (2001)
 Pentru prieteni (2002)
 O mare de dragoste (2004)
 Razna (2006)
 De 10 ani va multumim! (2007)
 Când zâmbești (2012)

Singles
 Nu pot face nimic (1998)
 Hi-Q iz in da hauz (1999)
 Apa de mare (1999)
 Totul va fi bine  (2000)
 E vara mea (2000)
 Cât te iubeam (2001)
 Un minut (2001)
 Dă muzica mai tare (2001)
 Tu ești dragostea mea (2002) Romanian Top 100= peak 1
 Prea departe (2002)
 Trăiește! (2003)
 Dor de tine, dor de noi (2003) Romanian Top 100= peak 1
 Mai dulce (2003)
 Poveste fără nume (2004)
 Gașca mea (2004)
 Te-am iubit, dar... (2005)
 Razna (2006)
 Ce bine e (2006)
 Buna dimineața (2007)
 Așa-s prietenii (2008)
 Lose You (2009)
 Ice Of you (2010)
 'The One (2010)
 Încă o dată (2010)
 Strada ta (2012)
 Solo (2012)
 Soare (2012)
 Luni (2013)

Notes

External links
 Official Hi-Q page
 Download mp3 - only for Romania
 MySpace Account
 Interview @ Radio Lynx
 Interview @ Acasa.ro
 Interview @ UUPS!

Romanian pop music groups